This is a list of former presidents of the United States who ran for office (the presidency, a seat in Congress, or governor) after leaving office as president. It does not include presidents who sought reelection to a consecutive term while still in office.

Some presidents have been recruited, requested, or drafted to run again. This list, however, only includes those presidents who actively campaigned.


Presidency
This list only includes former presidents who ran again for president.

Other elected office

Major appointed office

See also
List of presidents of the United States by other offices held

References

Former president
United States
Other office